The Cycle Messenger World Championships, or CMWCs, are an annual urban cycling competition whereby cycle messengers and cycling enthusiasts showcase their skills in an array of events, many of which simulate everyday tasks for a cycle messenger. Each year, the CMWCs are held in a different city around the world, with each host city designing its own unique course. The highlight of the CMWCs is the main race in which cyclists are given manifests and must pickup and deliver items to various locations around the host city as quickly and efficiently as possible.  The total number of pickups and deliveries, or "drop offs" is unknown to the messengers before the race, but has been known to reach up to 100 stops and usually takes between 3–4 hours to complete. The cyclist who completes all of the assigned deliveries in the least amount of time wins the race. In addition to the main race there are also several side events which have become increasingly popular over the past few years. These events change yearly depending on the discretion of the host city but usually include backward circles, bike polo, bunnyhop, cargo race, longest skid, sprints, and trackstand.

History
The idea for the Cycle Messenger World Championships, or Cycle Messenger Championships (CMCs) as it was initially called, was first conceived in 1992 by Achim Beier and his assistant, Stefan Klessman.  Both worked for messenger Berlin, a Berlin-based messenger service, and were inspired to have a gathering of the world's bicycle messengers after talking with co-worker and ex-Washington D.C. bicycle messenger Michael "Ozone" Odom. Beier then took a trip to New York City where he visited Washington Square Park and talked with local bicycle messengers including James "The General" Moore about the proposed idea. The idea was received well by the local messengers and thus Beier and Klessman began planning the logistics of the first Cycle Messenger Championships.

Since no competition of this type had ever taken place, there were many challenges to overcome before the first CMC be completed. Most notably, the host city, Berlin, needed to approve the proposal of such an event. This, in itself, was an enormous task since many streets had to be shut down for an entire weekend, the duration of the event, including Straße des 17. Juni, the main thoroughfare for East-West traffic through Berlin, and the area around Brandenburg Gate.  In the end, the city of Berlin approved the event with only minor changes to Beier's requests and in 1993 the first Cycle Messenger Championships took place. In all, around 500 messengers participated in the inaugural event.

Though the 1993 CMC was declared a success, it lost a substantial amount of money. As a result, Beier and Klessman decided to transfer ownership of the event to a sports marketing company which had expressed interest in organizing it. Beier and Klessman stayed with the project, acting as consultants, to ensure that the competition retained its authenticity.

The marketing company, though based in Berlin, had a partner in London and thus it was decided that the 1994 CMWC would be located there. Unfortunately though, months before the scheduled date of the CMWC the marketing company pulled its sponsorship of the event and left Beier and Klessman alone on the project.

After much deliberation, it was decided that the 1994 CMWC would still take place in London, though now it would be organized solely by cycle messengers. Against all odds, the event took place and attracted around 500 participants. Once again, the CMWC was deemed a success.

With the sting of the marketing company's withdrawal still fresh, several cycle messengers at the 1994 event decided to form a committee dedicated to the successful realization of the CMWC. Largely self-appointed and without any real power the committee floundered. The need for such an organization, however, was being realized by more and more cyclists.

The 1995 CMWC took place in Toronto, and in 1996 it was hosted in San Francisco. It was here that the International Federation of Bike Messengers Association, or IFBMA, was created for the purpose of guaranteeing that the CMWC would take place each year. This committee, unlike the previous one, was open to all who wished to attend and thus had the potential of being a legitimate organization.

Cycle Messenger World Championships 
Since the inception of the IFBMA the CMWCs have taken place each year in different locations around the world. The following is a list of host cities along with the year they hosted, or will host, the CMWCs:
 1993 Berlin, Germany
 1994 London, England
 1995 Toronto, Canada
 1996 San Francisco, United States
 1997 Barcelona, Spain
 1998 Washington D.C., USA
 1999 Zürich, Switzerland
 2000 Philadelphia, USA
 2001 Budapest, Hungary
 2002 Copenhagen, Denmark
 2003 Seattle, USA
 2004 Edmonton, Canada
 2005 New York City, USA
 2006 Sydney, Australia
 2007 Dublin, Ireland
 2008 Toronto, Canada
 2009 Tokyo, Japan

 2010 Panajachel, Guatemala
 2011 Warsaw, Poland
 2012 Chicago, USA
 2013 Lausanne, Switzerland
 2014 Mexico City, Mexico
 2015 Melbourne, Australia
 2016 Paris, France
 2017 Montreal, Canada
 2018 Riga, Latvia
 2019 Jakarta, Indonesia
 2020 no CMWC due to Covid
 2021 no CMWC due to Covid
2022 New York City, USA
2023 Yokohama, Japan

Events

Main Race

The main race is designed to simulate the normal workday of a cycle messenger. At the start of the race, depending on what format  is used, each messenger is given a manifest or a number of packages with the location of pick-ups and drop-offs of packages throughout the closed course. The course is composed of numbered or named checkpoints spread throughout a closed course which has been anywhere from a few kilometers to 10 kilometers or more in total track distance. Participants usually must traverse the length & breadth of the course many times to complete the event. The messengers seek to quickly and efficiently plan their routes in order to pick up and deliver each package in a timely manner. Several different systems have been used, most of these involve manifests, some involve multiple manifests. The total number of manifests and deliveries is unknown to the messengers before the start of the race but has been known to reach as high as 100 pick-ups and drop-offs. The field of cyclists is narrowed down after each manifest in some forms of this event but in others no elimination process is used and results are tallied for the entire field. The event usually takes between 3 and 4 hours to complete.

Sprints

The sprints are a shorter distance race, usually ranging from 200–300 meters in length, on a closed course with the cyclist crossing the finish line first declared the winner. Elimination rounds are utilized to determine the winner, usually 5-10 participants race each heat.

La Ocho
This event is not considered a portion of the CMWC but was attempted on one occasion at a CMWC event in Guatemala, but the event was never realized.

This figure-8 track was designed by architect Dieter Janssen especially for the 2010 CMWC at Panajachel, Guatemala.  The 200 meter course consisted of an Euler spiral loop built from rammed-earth with banked curves and a heavy timber over-under bridge intersection in the middle. The geometry was idealized for a 65 km/h speed, though its range could support a minimum of 12.8 km/h and a maximum of 140.9 km/h based on an average rider's weight, the expected frictional force and a maximum inclination angle of 45 degrees. 
Unfortunately the track was destroyed by rain before the event took place. The race was held on level ground with no bridge. Lines drawn on the surface indicated where the track might have been. In construction it never resembled the design provided by the architect, heavy timber abandoned for 4x4 & 2x4 stud frame construction. Banked turns were never achieved.

Bunny hop

This event has been described as the high jump of cycling. Designed to simulate the need for avoiding obstacles during a messenger's workday, contestants must use their bikes to jump over a bar of increasing height. Contestants  unable to clear the bar after two attempts at a particular height are eliminated from the competition. The last contestant remaining is declared the winner. The current CMWC record for this event is 1.27 meters set by Marlon Prather at the 1998 CMWC in Washington D.C., USA. Since the late 1990s a notable rise in popularity of the fixed gear bicycle has caused this event to decline as few participants are able to bunnyhop their fixed gear bicycles over any object of much more than 10 to 20 centimeters.

Track stand

The track stand competition is an event in which cyclists try to maintain a stationary position for as long as possible while on a bicycle.  All cyclists start off with both hands and feet on the bike in the traditional trackstand position.  As the competition progresses, cyclists are instructed to remove specific limbs from the bicycle.  The order which cyclists remove their limbs from the bicycle usually starts with taking off one hand, then both hands, one foot, then both feet.  The cyclist who remains balanced in an upright and stationary position the longest is declared the winner.

Skids

This competition consists of cyclists attempting to create the longest skid.  Quite possibly one of the most dangerous events other than the main race, competitors sprint toward a starting line then lock up their back wheel to initiate the skid.  Competitors must then balance themselves over their handlebars to create as little friction as possible between the rear stationary wheel and the ground while still steering their bicycle.  Each cyclist is given two attempts to skid as far as possible.  The record for the longest skid at the CMWC is set around 500 feet. It is not necessary to actually leave a "skid mark" and competitors are allowed to move their pedals slightly as well as to cause the rear wheel to leave the ground while trying to pivot their weight forward in order to decease friction between the road surface and rear wheel. An Exhibition event, this skill has no application in the actual function of a bicycle messenger.

Backward Circles

Like the Skids, this event has no correlation in simulating the ordinary workday of a cycle messenger. This competition requires cyclists to pedal backwards in consistent and consecutive circles.  The cyclist who can complete the most consecutive backward circles is declared the winner.

Cargo Race

This side event requires cyclists to transport oversized objects from one point to another.  Typical objects chosen for delivery range from beer kegs to boxes. Hay bales, pallets and lengths of lumber are also used in the challenge. Cyclists are encouraged to come up with creative ways of transporting such irregularly shaped objects while still using a bicycle.  Many competitors prefer to use panniers and trailers, while some even use specially designed bicycles for the event.

Bike polo

Bike polo follows the same general guidelines as hockey only this event is played using bikes.  This event has no correlation to any particular bicycle messenger skill but was introduced for the 2008 CMWC in Toronto because a number of bicycle messengers enjoy playing the game and bicycle messengers are credited for much of the hype and expansion of this sport. The 2008 tournament drew over 100 participants on 35 teams and lasted throughout the event. It was the first large and international bike polo tourney in history, presented as the first ever World Bike Polo Championships. Only a portion of the participants were bicycle messengers, the rest were polo players drawn to the tournament for its potential size due to its sponsorship by the CMWC 2008, although the tournament results were not included as CMWC results. Teams consisting of three cyclists used mallets to pass a ball and score as many goals as possible. Teams usually compete on a concrete court of varying sizes.

Reception

The CMWCs have been well received by the local populations of several host cities while others consider the event a nuisance.  For instance, the 2007 CMWCs in Dublin, Ireland, were pushed to the outer limits of the city after the local population protested the event.  On the other hand, the 2002 CMWCs held in Copenhagen, Denmark, were welcomed by the city and competitors were even treated to a free breakfast and free beer courtesy of the mayor.

Winners
2019

Open: Jimmi "Jumbo" Bargisen, By-Expressen, Copenhagen, Denmark

WTNB (Woman/Trans/Non-binary): Emma "Sdrella" Misale, Ubm, Italy

2018

Open (previously male): main race & cargo bike race: Jimmi "Jumbo" Bargisen, By-Expressen, Copenhagen, Denmark
 
WTF (previously female): main race & cargo-bike race: Clara "Orca" Felis, Hermes, Vienna, Austria

2017

M: Johannes Killisperger, By-Expressen, Copenhagen, Denmark
 
WTNB: Cécile Bloch, Coursier.fr, Paris, France

Cargo-bike M: Allan Shaw, Copenhagen, Denmark

Cargo-bike WTNB: Ale Lind-Kenny, Montreal, Canada

King of Track-M: Crihs Thormann, New York, NY USA

Queen of Track-F: Heather MacKinnon, Boston, MA USA

2016

M: Johannes Killisperger, By-Expressen, Copenhagen, Denmark
 
F: Cécile Bloch, Coursier.fr, Paris, France

Cargo-bike M: Ruben Hiddink, Cycloon Fietskoeriers, Groningen, Netherlands

Cargo-bike F: Sabine Python, Öpfelchasper Zürich, Zürich, Switzerland

2015

M: Austin Horse, Mess Kollective, New York, NY, USA
 
F: Christina Peck, Godspeed Courier, San Francisco, CA, USA

2014

M: Raphael Pfeiffer, vélocité, Lausanne, Switzerland

F: Christina Peck, Godspeed Courier, San Francisco, CA, USA

2013

M: Austin Horse, Mess Kollective, New York, NY, USA

F: Josephine Reitzel, vélocité, Lausanne, Switzerland

2012

M:  Craig Etheridge, KNR Couriers, Seattle, WA, USA

F:  Josephine Reitzel, vélocité, Lausanne, Switzerland

2011

M: Michael Brinkmann - Bremen, Germany 

F: Jenna Makgill - Auckland, New Zealand 

2010

M:  Craig Etheridge - Seattle, WA, USA 

F:  Josephine Reitzel - Lausanne, Switzerland

2009

M:  Juri Hanazumi - Tokyo, Japan 

F:  Johanna Reeder - Stockholm, Sweden 

2008

M:  Hiroyuki Shinozuka - Tokyo, Japan 

F:  Jenna Makgill - Auckland, New Zealand 

2007

M:  Peter Bradshaw - Boston, MA, USA 

F: Jaimie Lusk - Denver, CO, USA 

2006

M:  Raphael Faiss - Lausanne, Switzerland 

F:  Sarah Torgrimson - San Francisco, CA, USA 

2005

M:  Karl Stransky - Basel, Switzerland

F:  Johanna "Jojo" Reeder - Stockholm, Sweden 

2004

M:  Raphel Faiss - Lausanne, Switzerland

F:  Johanna "Jojo" Reeder - Stockholm, Sweden

2003

M:  Raphel Faiss - Lausanne, Switzerland 

F:  Sheba Farrin - Washington D.C., USA 

2002

F: Johanna "Jojo" Reeder, Stockholm, Sweden

2001

M:  Roger Zuercher - Zurich, Switzerland

F:  Pia - Copenhagen, Denmark

2000

M:  Carsten Schaffer - Copenhagen, Denmark 

F:  Sheba Farrin - Washington D.C., USA 

1999

M:  Friday - Copenhagen, Denmark 

F:  Chrissy Schenk - Zurich, Switzerland

1998

M:  Korte - Copenhagen, Denmark 

F:  Ivonne Kraft - Düsseldorf, Germany 

1997

M:  Lars Urban - Bremen, Germany 

F:  Ilona Luukko - Finland 

1996

M:  Sven Baumann - Switzerland 

F:  Ivonne Kraft - Düsseldorf, Germany 

1995

M:  Lars Urban - Bremen, Germany 

F:  Ivonne Kraft - Düsseldorf, Germany 

1994

M:  Andy Scheider - Cologne, Germany

F:  Ivonne Kraft - Düsseldorf, Germany

1993

M:  Andy Scheider - Cologne, Germany 

F:  Ursi Haenny - Basel, Switzerland

See also
European Cycle Messenger Championships

References

Cycling events